is a video game released by Hudson Soft in early 1997. It is the fifth installment of the Super Bomberman series and the final Bomberman game to be released on the Super Famicom. The game was released in two variations: a standard cartridge and a gold cartridge, which was sold through CoroCoro Comic. The gold cartridge included extra maps in battle mode.

Gameplay 

The single-player portion of Super Bomberman 5 is nonlinear, giving players a choice of which level they'd like to complete next. These phases are all based on the four previous Super Bomberman games for the Super Famicom, containing remixed music and the same sprites of the game, and the fifth phase is completely new. Depending on your path, you can accumulate 100% of completion.  There are two endings available, depending on where you face the final boss. After finishing 100%, the game map is reset, which allows player to finish the maps 200%. When completing 200% of the map, a new password is given.

In multiplayer, there are nine characters to choose from, and over 10 maps to play on (though the extra three maps in the gold version can be unlocked in the normal cart as well). A create-a-character mode, which is unique to Super Bomberman 5, lets players choose their character and color and allows them a number of points. These points can be used to equip the power-up items from the single-player game. If you enter in password menu (Options → Password) 0413, the maps in battle mode will change. There are also 10 playable characters in Battle Mode, nine of which are bosses in Normal Mode.

Story
An evil Bomber named Emperor Terrorin who has the power of time itself has freed various criminal Bombers from their prison cells in orbit around Planet Bomber. Setting them up in a warped time and space, White Bomber, Black Bomber, and their Louie (Rooey) companions must travel through stages and defeat them before going up against Emperor Terrorin himself.

Development and release 

3 cartridges of this game have been released, a standard cartridge and a gold cartridge, which was sold through CoroCoro Comic. The gold cartridge included extra maps (stages 11,12,13) in battle mode and another cartridge Caravan Event Ban propose apparently alternatives characters and customisation mode (this need to be verified)

Reception

Notes

References

External links 
 Super Bomberman 5 at Hudson Soft (Japanese) on Wayback Machine
 Super Bomberman 5 at GameFAQs
 Super Bomberman 5 at Giant Bomb
 Super Bomberman 5 at MobyGames

1997 video games
Action video games
Bomberman
Hudson Soft games
Japan-exclusive video games
Maze games
Multiplayer and single-player video games
Puzzle video games
Super Nintendo Entertainment System games
Super Nintendo Entertainment System-only games
Video games developed in Japan
Video games scored by Jun Chikuma
Video games scored by Yasuhiko Fukuda